The Race is a 1916 American drama silent film directed by George Melford and written by Hector Turnbull and Clinton Stagg. The film stars Victor Moore, Anita King, Ronald Bradbury, William Dale, Mrs. Lewis McCord and Ernest Joy. The film was released on April 6, 1916, by Paramount Pictures. The film is lost.

Plot 
Although the film was advertised as being based on Anita King's real cross country trip in a roadster, the film actually follows the adventures of a man (Victor Moore) trying to win money in a transcontinental car race to pay back debt he owes. He eventually realizes that Grace (Anita King) needs money for her father and intentionally lets her win. The man gets money from an engine patent in the end anyway and that covers what he owes.

Cast 
Victor Moore as Jimmy Grayson Jr.
Anita King as Grace Van Dyke
Ronald Bradbury as James Grayson Sr.
William Dale as Andrew Van Dyke
Mrs. Lewis McCord as Mrs. Jefferson
Ernest Joy as Mr. Anderson
Horace B. Carpenter as A Mechanic

References

External links 
 
 lobby poster

1916 films
1910s English-language films
Silent American drama films
1916 drama films
Paramount Pictures films
Films directed by George Melford
American black-and-white films
American silent feature films
American auto racing films
1910s American films